Captain H. W. Davies was a male badminton player from England.

Davies won the second All England Open Badminton Championships edition in men's singles in 1901.

References

English male badminton players
English male tennis players
British male tennis players
Place of birth missing
Year of birth missing
Year of death missing
19th-century births
20th-century deaths